Destruction (2013) was a professional wrestling pay-per-view (PPV) event promoted by New Japan Pro-Wrestling (NJPW). The event took place on September 29, 2013, in Kobe, Hyōgo, at the Kobe World Memorial Hall. The event featured ten matches (including one dark match), four of which were contested for championships. It was the seventh event under the Destruction name.

Storylines
Destruction featured ten professional wrestling matches that involved different wrestlers from pre-existing scripted feuds and storylines. Wrestlers portrayed villains, heroes, or less distinguishable characters in the scripted events that built tension and culminated in a wrestling match or series of matches.

Event
As part of the newly revived relationship between NJPW and the National Wrestling Alliance (NWA), the event featured the third time Rob Conway defended the NWA World Heavyweight Championship in a NJPW ring. The event also saw the culmination of a storyline rivalry between Hiroshi Tanahashi and Prince Devitt, with Tanahashi emerging victorious in a Lumberjack Deathmatch, which set him up as the next challenger for the IWGP Heavyweight Championship. Tetsuya Naito, coming off winning the 2013 G1 Climax, defeated Masato Tanaka to retain his certificate for an IWGP Heavyweight Championship match at Wrestle Kingdom 8 in Tokyo Dome and capture the NEVER Openweight Championship. In the semi-main event, a rematch from Wrestling Dontaku 2013, Shinsuke Nakamura successfully defended the IWGP Intercontinental Championship against Shelton X Benjamin, avenging a loss from final day of the 2013 G1 Climax. In the main event, Kazuchika Okada successfully defended the IWGP Heavyweight Championship against Satoshi Kojima, also avenging a prior loss from the final day of the 2013 G1 Climax.

Results

References

External links
The official New Japan Pro-Wrestling website

2013
2013 in professional wrestling
September 2013 events in Japan